Andrei Alekseyevich Akimenko (born 18 February 1979) is a former Russian professional football player.

Club career
He played in the Russian Football National League for FC Fakel Voronezh in 2002.

References

External links
 
 

1979 births
Footballers from Moscow
Living people
Russian footballers
Association football defenders
PFC CSKA Moscow players
FC Fakel Voronezh players
FC Vityaz Podolsk players
FC Zvezda Irkutsk players
FC Saturn Ramenskoye players